Analomink is a section of Stroud Township, Monroe County, Pennsylvania.

History 
The village of Spragueville was founded in 1848. It was known for the manufacturing of sprags (or spragues). At the time, the wood sprags were widely used in coal mines to lock the wheels of mining cars to prevent rolling. The term sprag was also applied to the prop used to support the roof of a mine. It was from the local production of sprags that the village's name is believed to have evolved. About a year after the founding of Spragueville, the post office reportedly began operations, presumably with the Analomink name.

Nearby were Analomink Creek (known today as the Brodhead Creek) and Analomink Waterfalls, more recently known as the Penn Hills falls.

Throughout the years, the name Analomink (meaning "tumbling water" in the local American Indian language) was associated with the village of Spragueville, but a town with two names caused confusion. At this time, the village was a stop on the Delaware, Lackawanna and Western Railroad (DL&W). In 1901, residents sought to change the name of their village to conform with the name of its post office. It took about five years to have the town's identifier changed to Analomink. Spragueville was used unofficially for a time after the transition.

See also
Analomink (NJT station)

References

Unincorporated communities in Monroe County, Pennsylvania
Unincorporated communities in Pennsylvania